Cabaret is a 1927 American silent crime drama film produced by Famous Players-Lasky, distributed by Paramount Pictures, directed by Robert G. Vignola, and starring Gilda Gray.

The film was considered a rival to Paramount's own Underworld released later in 1927. Cabaret is now presumed to be a lost film. It was the winner of the Photoplay award in 1927.

Plot summary

Cast
 Gilda Gray as Gloria Trask
 Tom Moore as Detective Tom Westcott
 Chester Conklin as Jerry Trask
 Mona Palma as Blanche Howard (*Mona also known as Mimi Palmeri)
 Jack Egan as Andy Trask
 William Harrigan as Jack Costigan
 Charles Byer as Sam Roberts
 Anna Lavsa as Mrs. Trask

References

External links
 
 
 
 
 two lobby posters Cabaret; #1,...#2

1927 films
American silent feature films
Lost American films
Famous Players-Lasky films
Films directed by Robert G. Vignola
American crime drama films
1927 crime drama films
American black-and-white films
1927 lost films
1920s American films
Silent American drama films